German studies is the field of humanities that researches, documents and disseminates German language and literature in both its historic and present forms. Academic departments of German studies often include classes on German culture, German history, and German politics in addition to the language and literature component. In English, the terms Germanistics or Germanics are sometimes used (mostly by Germans), but the subject is more often referred to as German studies, German language and literature, or German philology.

Modern German studies is usually seen as a combination of two sub-disciplines:  German linguistics and Germanophone literature studies.

German linguistics

German linguistics is traditionally called philology in Germany, as there is something of a difference between philologists and linguists. It is roughly divided as follows:
 Old High German (Althochdeutsch) 8th – 11th centuries
 Middle High German (Mittelhochdeutsch) 11th – 14th centuries
 Early New High German (Frühneuhochdeutsch) 14th – 17th centuries
 Modern German (Standard German, German dialectology) 18th – 21st centuries

In addition, the discipline examines German under various aspects: the way it is spoken and written, i.e., spelling; declination; vocabulary; sentence structure; texts; etc. It compares the various manifestations such as social groupings (slang, written texts, etc.) and geographical groupings (dialects, etc.).

German literature studies

The study of German literature is divided into two parts:  Ältere Deutsche Literaturwissenschaft deals with the period from the beginnings of German in the early Middle Ages up to post-Medieval times around AD 1750, while the modern era is covered by Neuere Deutsche Literaturwissenschaft. The field systematically examines German literature in terms of genre, form, content, and motifs as well as looking at it historically by author and epoch.  Important areas include edition philology, history of literature, and textual interpretation.  The relationships of German literature to the literatures of other languages (e.g. reception and mutual influences) and historical contexts are also important areas of concentration. The Penguin Dictionary of Literary Terms and Literary Theory: Fourth Edition is printed in English but contains many German-language literary terms that apply cross-culturally in the field of literary criticism; quite a few of the in terms in the book originated in German but have since been adopted by English-language critics and scholars.

German teacher education 
At least in Germany and Austria, German studies in academia play a central role in the education of German school teachers. Their courses usually cover four fields:
 Linguistics of German
 German language and literature of up to about 1750
 German language and literature since approximately 1750
 Specifics of the didactics of teaching German
Several universities offer specialized curricula for school teachers, usually called "".

History

As an unsystematic field of interest for individual scholars, German studies can be traced back to Tacitus' Germania. The publication and study of legal and historical source material, such as Medieval Bible translations, were all undertaken during the German Renaissance of the sixteenth century, truly initiating the field of German studies.  As an independent university subject, German studies was introduced at the beginning of the nineteenth century by Georg Friedrich Benecke, the Brothers Grimm, and Karl Lachmann.

University departments and research institutions
US
 Department of German Studies, University of Arizona, Tucson
 German Program of the Department of World Languages & Literatures, University of Arkansas, Fayetteville
 Department of German Studies, Brown University
 Department of German, University of California, Berkeley
 Department of Germanic Languages, University of California, Los Angeles
 Department of German Studies, University of Cincinnati
 Department of Germanic and Slavic Languages and Literatures, University of Colorado, Boulder, CO
 Department of Germanic Languages, Columbia University
 Department of German Studies, Cornell University
 Department of German Studies, Dartmouth College
 Department of German, Duke University
 Department of Germanic Languages and Literatures, Harvard University
 Department of Germanic Studies, University of Illinois at Chicago, Chicago, IL
Department of Germanic Languages and Literatures, University of Illinois at Urbana-Champaign
Department of Germanic Studies, Indiana University
 German and Scandinavian Studies, University of Massachusetts Amherst
 Department of Germanic Languages and Literatures, University of Michigan, Ann Arbor, MI
 Department of German, Scandinavian, and Dutch, University of Minnesota
 Department of German, New York University
 Department of Germanic and Slavic Languages and Literatures, University of North Carolina at Chapel Hill
 Department of German, Northwestern University
 Department of Germanic Languages and Literatures, Ohio State University, Columbus, Ohio
 Department of Germanic Languages and Literatures, University of Pennsylvania
 Department of Germanic and Slavic Languages, Pennsylvania State University, Pennsylvania
 Department of Germanic Languages and Literature, University of Pittsburgh, Pennsylvania
 Department of German, Princeton University
 Department of Germanic Studies, University of Texas at Austin
 Department of Classical & Modern Languages, Truman State University, Kirksville, Missouri
 Department of Germanic and Slavic Languages, Vanderbilt University, Nashville, Tennessee
 Department of Germanic and Russian, University of Vermont, Burlington, Vermont
 Department of Germanic Languages and Literatures, University of Virginia
 Department of Germanics, University of Washington, Seattle, Washington
 Department of Germanic Languages and Literatures, Washington University in St. Louis, St. Louis, Missouri
 Department of German, Nordic, and Slavic, University of Wisconsin – Madison
 Department of German, Yale University
Department of Linguistics & Germanic, Slavic, Asian and African Languages, Michigan State University

UK
 Department of German, University of Oxford
 Department of German, University of Cambridge
 Department of German, University of Manchester
 Department of German Studies, University of Warwick
Austria
 Institute for German Studies (Institut für Germanistik), University of Vienna
Canada
 Department of German Language and Literature, Queen's University, Kingston, Ontario
 Department of Germanic Languages and Literatures, University of Toronto

China
 Department of German, Beijing Foreign Studies University, Haidian District, Beijing
 Institute of German and European Studies, Tongji University, Yangpu District, Shanghai
Czech Republic
 Department of German and Austrian Studies, Charles University in Prague
 Department of German Studies, Palacký University in Olomouc
India
 Jawaharlal Nehru University India
Ireland
 Department of Germanic Studies, Trinity College, The University of Dublin, Ireland
 Department of German, National University of Ireland – University College Cork, Cork, Ireland
Israel
 Bucerius Institute for Research of Contemporary German History and Society  – University of Haifa 
 Haifa Center for German and European Studies – University of Haifa 
Germany
"German studies" is taught at many German universities. Some examples are:

 Germanistisches Seminar der Universität Bonn, Institut für Germanistik, vergleichende Literatur- und Kulturwissenschaft, Rheinische Friedrich-Wilhelms-Universität Bonn
 Institut für deutsche Sprache und Literatur I & II, Albertus-Magnus-Universität zu Köln
 Institut für Germanistik I & II, Hamburg University
 Germanistisches Seminar, Heidelberg University Faculty of Modern Languages
 Institut für deutsche Philologie, Ludwig Maximilian University of Munich
 Germanistisches Institut, Westfälische Wilhelms-Universität Münster
 Deutsches Seminar, Tübingen University Faculty of Modern Languages
Greece
 Faculty of German Language and Literature, National and Kapodistrian University of Athens
 School of German Language and Literature, Aristotle University of Thessaloniki
Russia
 Department of Area Studies, Moscow State University
South Africa
 School of Languages and Literatures, German Studies, University of Cape Town
Spain
 Área de Filología Alemana, University of Salamanca

See also
Area studies
German National Honor Society (Delta Epsilon Phi) in the US
German Studies Association
Germanic philology
Germanisches Nationalmuseum
New Objectivity
Sturm und Drang

Bibliography

Books
 Atlas Deutsche Sprache [CD-ROM].  Berlin: Directmedia Publishing.  2004.
 Die Deutschen Klassiker (CD-ROM).
 Berman, Antoine: L'épreuve de l'étranger. Culture et traduction dans l'Allemagne romantique: Herder, Goethe, Schlegel, Novalis, Humboldt, Schleiermacher, Hölderlin. Paris: Gallimard, 1984. .
 Beutin, Wolfgang. Deutsche Literaturgeschichte. Von den Anfängen bis zur Gegenwart.  Stuttgart: J. B. Metzler, 1992.
 Bogdal, Klaus-Michael, Kai Kauffmann, & Georg Mein. BA-Studium Germanistik. Ein Lehrbuch. In collaboration with Meinolf Schumacher and Johannes Volmert. Reinbek bei Hamburg: Rowohlt, 2008. 
 Burger, Harald. Sprache der Massenmedien. Berlin: Walter de Gruyter, 1984.
 Ernst, Peter. Germanistische Sprachwissenschaft. Vienna: WUV, 2004.
 Fohrmann, Jürgen & Wilhelm Voßkamp, eds. Wissenschaftsgeschichte der Germanistik im 19. Jahrhundert. Stuttgart: J. B. Metzler, 1994.
 Hartweg, Frédéric G. Frühneuhochdeutsch. Eine Einführung in die deutsche Sprache des Spätmittelalters und der frühen Neuzeit.  Tübingen: Niemeyer, 2005.
 Hermand, Jost. Geschichte der Germanistik. Reinbek bei Hamburg: Rowohlt, 1994. 
 Hickethier, Knut. Film- und Fernsehanalyse. Stuttgart: J. B. Metzler, 1993.
 Hickethier, Knut, ed. Aspekte der Fernsehanalyse. Methoden und Modelle. Hamburg: Lit, 1994.
 Hohendahl, Peter Uwe. German Studies in the United States: A Historical Handbook. New York: Modern Language Association of America, 2003.
 Kanzog, Klaus. Einführung in die Filmphilologie. Munich: Schaudig, Bauer, Ledig, 1991.
 Muckenhaupt, Manfred: Text und Bild. Grundfragen der Beschreibung von Text-Bild-Kommunikation aus sprachwissenschaftlicher Sicht. Tübingen: Gunter Narr, 1986.
 Prokop, Dieter: Medienprodukte. Zugänge – Verfahren – Kritik. Tübingen: Gunter Narr, 1981.
 Schneider, Jost, ed. Methodengeschichte der Germanistik. Berlin: De Gruyter, 2009.
 Schumacher, Meinolf. Einführung in die deutsche Literatur des Mittelalters. Darmstadt: Wissenschaftliche Buchgesellschaft, 2010. 
 Shitanda, So. "Zur Vorgeschichte und Entstehung der deutschen Philologie im 19. Jh.: Karl Lachmann und die Brüder Grimm", in Literarische Problematisierung der Moderne. Medienprodukte : Zugänge-- Verfahren-- Kritik, ed. by Teruaki Takahashi. Munich: Iudicium, 1992.
 Van Cleve, John W. and A. Leslie Willson. Remarks on the Needed Reform of German Studies in the United States. Columbia, SC: Camden House, 1993.

Journals 
 Acta Germanica
Arbitrium
German Life and Letters
 German Studies Review
The Germanic Review
Germanistik
Germanistik in Ireland
The German Quarterly
Goethe Yearbook
Journal of Austrian Studies
 The Journal of English and Germanic Philology
 Journal of Germanic Linguistics
Lessing Yearbook
Modern Language Notes (German Issue)
Monatshefte 
Michigan Germanic Studies
New German Critique
Oxford German Studies 
Publications of the English Goethe Society
Seminar
 Teaching German (Unterrichtspraxis)
Text+Kritik
Transit
Zeitschrift für interkulturelle Germanistik
Zeitschrift für Germanistik

References

External links
 BUBL Link (UK-based) Catalogue of Internet Resources Concerning the German Language:  https://web.archive.org/web/20060218094937/http://bubl.ac.uk/link/g/germanlanguage.htm (well organized; covers many aspects of the language and the study of it)
 https://web.archive.org/web/20050718171402/http://www.library.adelaide.edu.au/guide/hum/german/german_net.html (University of Adelaide's categorized guide to German Area Studies online)
 http://www.dartmouth.edu/~wess/wesslit.html  (Dartmouth's German-Studies Web links, annotated and arranged by topic)
 https://web.archive.org/web/20051104142631/http://libadm87.rice.edu/ref/german.cfm (Rice University's guide to German studies, including printed literature and links to German newspapers and magazines)
 http://www.germanistik.net/ germanistik.net (tries to get the user straight to the best sources of help; in German)
 Germanistik im Netz – Erlanger Liste (The 'Erlanger Liste' is currently the largest collection of links to the various aspects of G***, including such archives, publishers, etc.; in German)
 Literaturwissenschaft online ("Literaturwissenschaft online" Kiel University's e-learning site with live and archived lectures; free of charge; in German.)
 Bibliographie der Deutschen Sprach- und Literaturwissenschaft ("BDSL Online" is the electronic version of the largest bibliography in the field of German language and literature studies.  Access to report years 1985–1995 is free of charge.)
 https://web.archive.org/web/20060418211215/http://www.doaj.org/ljbs?cpid=8  (DOAJ Directory of Open Access Journals, Literature and Languages)
 https://web.archive.org/web/20060411030830/http://www.sign-lang.uni-hamburg.de/Medienprojekt/Literatur/9.med.analy.html (University of Hamburg site with media studies bibliography)
 Categorical list of German Departments around the world 
 Departmental Ratings (USA)
 Directory of some German resources in libraries and research centers throughout California
  American Library Association German Studies Web
Library guides
 University of Leeds German, Russian and Slavonic Studies
 University of Wisconsin-Madison German-language Humanities

 
German culture
European studies
Germanic philology
Humanities
Germanic studies